The arc spring (also known as - bow spring, curved spring, circular spring or "banana" spring) is a special form of coil spring which was originally developed for use in the dual-mass flywheel of internal combustion engine drive trains. The term "arc spring" is used to describe pre-curved or arc-shaped helical compression springs. They have an arc-shaped coil axis.

Function 
Like other technical springs, arc springs are based on the fundamental principle of storing mechanical work in the form of potential energy and the ability to release this energy again. The force is applied through the ends of the spring. A torque  can be transmitted around an axis via the force  directed along this helical axis and the lever arm to the system center point . The wire of the arc spring is mainly subjected to torsional stress.

Support  

An arc spring requires suitable support to transmit torque. The support is usually provided from the outside in the form of an arcuate channel (sliding shell) or radially shaped support plates. This prevents buckling of the arc spring. Another result of this support is a hysteresis between the loading and unloading curves in the characteristic curve. This results from the friction of the spring on the radial support and is an intended effect to achieve damping in the system.

Arc spring systems 
As with compression springs, spring systems can also be used for arc springs. The main designs are series and parallel connection. With these, single-stage or multi-stage spring characteristics can be achieved. In order to make optimum use of the available space, systems consisting of inner and outer arc springs are often used.

In addition, the spring characteristic can be influenced by other parameters such as the cross-sectional geometry of the wire, the coil diameter or the number of coils. CAD configurators, which generate a CAD model after entering certain parameters, can contribute to optimal design.

Applications 

The arc spring is suitable for static and quasi-static as well as dynamic applications. Examples include:

 Dynamic applications:
 Dual mass flywheel
 Torque converter
Arc spring clutch
 Belt tensioners, pulley decouplers

 Static and quasi-static applications:
 Center position return in a robot joint
 Elastic element in exoskeletons
 Reset of tailgates or backrests

Materials and their standardization  
In principle, the spring steels used for ordinary coil springs can also be used for arc springs. These are:

 DIN EN 10270-1 Patented-drawn unalloyed spring steel wire                       
 DIN EN 10270-2 Oil tempered spring steel wire                                           
 DIN EN 10270-3 Stainless spring steel wire

Important parameters

References 

Springs (mechanical)